Chris Siegfried is the former head coach of the Arkansas Twisters of the now-defunct arenafootball2. He was previously the offensive coordinator of the Jacksonville Sharks (2010) and Kansas City Brigade (2007), teams in the Arena Football League, the head coach of the Spokane Shock (2006), the South Georgia Wildcats (2005), and the Cape Fear Wildcats (2002–2004) of the af2.  While at Spokane, he led the first year expansion team to a 14-2 regular season record and the ArenaCup Championship.

On September 15, 2010, he was named the first head coach of the expansion Pittsburgh Power of the Arena Football League.  He led the Power to a 9–9 inaugural season, and after a 2–8 start in 2012 he was fired.

On June 30, 2016, Siegfried was named the first director of football operations for the new National Arena League. In October 2017, he was named the commissioner of the NAL for its second season.

References

External links
ArenaFan bio page
Arkansas Twisters bio page

Year of birth missing (living people)
Living people
Jacksonville Sharks coaches
Kansas City Command coaches
Pittsburgh Power coaches
South Georgia Wildcats coaches
Spokane Shock coaches
Sportspeople from Pennsylvania
Texas Revolution coaches